Züschen may refer to:

Züschen, Fritzlar, a village in Hesse, Germany
Züschen (megalithic tomb), a prehistoric burial monument in Hesse, Germany